László Földi (born 7 September 1952) is a Hungarian politician, who served as the mayor of Cegléd between 2006 and 2014. He is a member of the National Assembly (MP) for Cegléd (Pest County Constituency XV then XII) since 2010. He was appointed one of the recorders of the parliament in May 2014.

Personal life
He is married. His wife is Lászlóné Földi (née Éva Krajcsi). They have four children, including Nóra, Márton Levente, Mátyás.

References

1952 births
Living people
Mayors of places in Hungary
Fidesz politicians
Christian Democratic People's Party (Hungary) politicians
Members of the National Assembly of Hungary (2010–2014)
Members of the National Assembly of Hungary (2014–2018)
Members of the National Assembly of Hungary (2018–2022)
Members of the National Assembly of Hungary (2022–2026)
People from Abony